In nonstandard analysis, a branch of mathematics, overspill (referred to as overflow by Goldblatt (1998, p. 129)) is a widely used proof technique. It is based on the fact that the set of standard natural numbers N is not an internal subset of the internal set *N of hypernatural numbers. 

By applying the induction principle for the standard integers N and the transfer principle we get the principle of internal induction:

For any internal subset A of *N,  if
 1 is an element of A, and
 for every element n of A,  n + 1 also belongs to A,
then
A = *N

If N were an internal set, then instantiating the internal induction principle with N, it would follow N = *N which is known not to be the case.

The overspill principle has a number of useful consequences:
 The set of standard hyperreals is not internal.
 The set of bounded hyperreals is not internal.
 The set of infinitesimal hyperreals is not internal.

In particular:
  If an internal set contains all infinitesimal non-negative hyperreals, it contains a positive non-infinitesimal (or appreciable) hyperreal.
  If an internal set contains N  it contains an unlimited (infinite) element of *N.

Example
These facts can be used to prove the equivalence of the following two conditions for an internal hyperreal-valued function ƒ defined on *R.

 
and

 

The proof that the second fact implies the first uses overspill, since given a non-infinitesimal positive ε,

 

Applying overspill, we obtain a positive appreciable δ with the requisite properties.

These equivalent conditions express the property known in nonstandard analysis as S-continuity (or microcontinuity) of ƒ at x. S-continuity is referred to as an external property.  The first definition is external because it involves quantification over standard values only.  The second definition is external because it involves the external relation of being infinitesimal.

References 
Robert Goldblatt (1998). Lectures on the hyperreals. An introduction to nonstandard analysis. Springer.

Nonstandard analysis